Javad Mahjoub (born 26 May 1991 in Chenaran, Razavi Khorasan Province, Iran) is an Iranian judoka.

He competed for Iran at the following tournaments:
 2010 Asian Games, 7th
 2011 World Judo Championships, Quarter-finals
 2012 Asian Judo Championships, Silver Medal
 2012 World Cup, Prague

Mixed martial arts record

|-
|
|align=center|
|Kacper Miklasz
|
|Hexagone MMA 7
|
|align=center|
|align=center|
|Poitiers, France
|
|}

References

External links

 
 
 

1991 births
Living people
Sportspeople from Mashhad
Iranian male judoka
Judoka at the 2010 Asian Games
Judoka at the 2014 Asian Games
Judoka at the 2018 Asian Games
Judoka at the 2016 Summer Olympics
Olympic judoka of Iran
Asian Games competitors for Iran
Refugee Olympic Team at the 2020 Summer Olympics
Judoka at the 2020 Summer Olympics
21st-century Iranian people